These are the rosters of all participating teams at the men's water polo tournament at the 2013 World Aquatics Championships in Piscines Bernat Picornell, Barcelona, Spain from 23 July–3 August.

Group A

Head coach: Sakis Kechagias

Zdravko Radić
Draško Brguljan
Vjekoslav Pasković
Antonio Petrović
Darko Brguljan
Ugo Crousillat
Mlađan Janović
Nikola Janović
Aleksandar Ivović
Sasa Misić
Filip Klikovać
Predrag Jokić
Miloš Šćepanović

Iñaki Aguilar
Ricard Alarcón
Ruben de Lera
Albert Español
Pere Estrany
Xavier García
Daniel López
Marc Minguell
Guillermo Molina
Alberto Munarriz
Felipe Perrone
Balázs Szirányi
Xavier Vallès

Thomas Kingsmill
Matthew Lewis
Stefan Curry
Finn Lowery
Jonathon Ross
Andrew Sieprath
Daniel Jackson
Matthew Small
Eamon Lui-Fakaotimanava
Matthew Bryant
Lachlan Tijsen
Adam Pye
Dylan Smith

Group B

Justin Boyd
Nicolas Constantin-Bicari
John Conway
Devon Diggle
Luka Gasic 
Kevin Graham
Constantin Kudaba
Ivan Marcisin
Jared McElroy
Alel Taschereau
Robin Randall
Scott Robinson
Oliver Vikalo

Josip Pavić
Luka Lončar
Ivan Milaković
Fran Paskvalin
Maro Joković
Luka Bukić
Petar Muslim
Andro Bušlje
Sandro Sukno
Nikša Dobud
Anđelo Šetka
Paulo Obradović
Marko Bijač

Dwayne Flatscher
Etienne Le Roux
Devon Card
Ignardus Badenhorst
Nicholas Rodda
Jason Kyte
Richard Downes
Ryan Bell
Dean Whyte
Pierre Le Roux
Nicholas Molyneux
Adam Kajee
Donn Stewart

Merrill Moses
Janson Wigo
Alexander Obert
Alexander Bowen
Matthew De Trane
Chancellor Ramirez
J. W. Krumpholz
Tony Azevedo
Shea Buckner
Tim Hutten
Michael Rosenthal
John Mann
Andrew Stevens

Group C

Joel Dennerley
Richard Campbell
Matthew Martin
John Cotterill
Nathan Power
Jarrod Gilchrist
Aidan Roach
Aaron Younger
Joel Swift
Tyler Martin
Rhys Howden
William Miller
James Clark

Ge Weiqing
Tan Feihu
Liang Zhongxing
Jiang Bin
Guo Junliang
Pan Ning
Li Bin
Wang Yang
Xie Junmin
Zhang Jian
Zhang Chufeng
Liang Nianxiang
Wu Honghui

Attila Decker
Viktor Nagy
Bence Bátori
Krisztián Bedő
Ádám Decker
Miklós Gór-Nagy
Balázs Hárai
Norbert Hosnyánszky
Norbert Madaras
Márton Szivós
Dániel Varga
Dénes Varga
Márton Vámos
Coach: Tibor Benedek

Milan Aleksić
Miloš Ćuk
Filip Filipović
Živko Gocić
Dušan Mandić
Branislav Mitrović
Stefan Mitrović
Slobodan Nikić
Duško Pijetlović
Gojko Pijetlović
Andrija Prlainović
Nikola Rađen
Vanja Udovičić

Group D

Erik Bukowski
Dennis Eidner
Maurice Jüngling
Roger Kong
Erik Miers
Heiko Nossek
Moritz Oeler
Julian Real
Till Rohe
Moritz Schenkel
Andreas Schlotterbeck
Paul Schüler
Marko Stamm

Stefano Tempesti
Amaurys Pérez
Niccolò Gitto
Pietro Figlioli
Alex Giorgetti
Maurizio Felugo
Niccolò Figari
Valentino Gallo
Christian Presciutti
Deni Fiorentini
Matteo Aicardi
Christian Napolitano
Marco Del Lungo

Nikolay Maksimov
Sergey Gubarev
Yevgeniy Medvedev
Roman Pilipenko
Murat Shakenov
Alexey Shmider
Vladimir Ushakov
Anton Koliadenko
Rustam Ukumanov
Mikhail Ruday
Ravil Manafov
Branko Pekovich
Valeriy Shlemov

Dragoș Stoenescu
Petru Ianc
Tiberiu Negrean
Nicolae Diaconu
Daniel Teohari
Andrei Bușilă
Alexandru Matei
Mihnea Chioveanu
Dimitri Goantă
Ramiro Georgescu
Alexandru Ghiban
Andrei Crețu
Mihai Drăgușin

See also
Water polo at the 2013 World Aquatics Championships – Women's team rosters

References

External links
Official website
Records and statistics (reports by Omega)

World Aquatics Championships water polo squads
Men's team rosters